The European Parliament election of 2004 took place on 12–13 June 2004.

The Olive Tree was the most voted list in Trentino, while the South Tyrolean People's Party (SVP) came first as usual in South Tyrol. However the SVP lost many votes to the Greens, which had their best result ever, and to the Union for South Tyrol (UfS).

Results

Trentino

Source: Ministry of the Interior

South Tyrol

Source: Ministry of the Interior

2004 elections in Italy
Elections in Trentino-Alto Adige/Südtirol
European Parliament elections in Italy
2004 European Parliament election